Penza State University is a state university in the city of Penza. It was founded in 1943. The university has nine faculties and five institutes.

History
Formed on the basis evacuated to Penza Odessa Industrial Institute by Order of the All-Union Committee for Higher Education of the Council of People's Commissars of the USSR "On the resumption of the activities of the Odessa Industrial Institute in the city of Penza" signed on July 3, 1943.

The Penza Industrial Institute, as it was initially called, opened on November 1, 1943, comprising 11 departments. In 1959, by order of the Minister of Higher Education, Penza Industrial Institute was renamed the Penza Polytechnic Institute, and on the basis of the construction department was formed as Penza Civil Engineering Institute. On July 5, 1993 by order of the Chairman of the State Committee for Higher Education Penza Polytechnic Institute was renamed Penza State Technical University. On January 22, 1998, by order of the Minister of Education of the Russian Federation, Penza State Technical University was renamed Penza State University.

History 
It was founded on the basis of the Odessa Industrial Institute, which was relocated to Penza by the order of the All-Union Committee for Higher Education under the Council of People's Commissars of the USSR "On resumption of activities of Odessa Industrial Institute in the city of Penza" of July 3 1943.

It was opened under the name "Penza Industrial Institute" on November 1 1943 and had 11 departments.

In 1959 by the order of the Minister of Higher Education of the USSR "Penza Industrial Institute" was renamed into "Penza Polytechnical Institute", and on the basis of the Faculty of Construction Penza Civil Engineering Institute was formed.

On July 5 1993 by the order of Chairman of the State Higher Education Committee of the Russian Federation Penza Polytechnical Institute was renamed into Penza State Technical University.

On January 22 1998 by the order of Minister of General and Professional Education of the Russian Federation Penza State Technical University was renamed into Penza State University.

Institutes 
PSU includes the following institutes:
 Institute of Military Training 
 Institute of Sport and Physical Training
 Medical Institute
 Institute of Ongoing Education
 V.G. Belinsky Institute of Teacher Education
 Polytechnic Institute
 Institute of Economics and Administration
 Institute of Law

Faculties 
PSU includes the following faculties:
 Faculty of Computer Engineering (Polytechnic Institute)
 Faculty of History, Languages and Literature
 Faculty of General Medicine
 Faculty of Industrial Technologies, Power Engineering and Transport (Polytechnic Institute)
 Faculty of Pedagogy, Psychology and Social Sciences 
 Faculty of Information Technology and Electronics (Polytechnic Institute)
 Faculty of Dentistry 
 Faculty of Physics, Mathematics and Natural Sciences

Branches 
PSU comprises the following branches:
 Kuznetsk Institute of Information and Management Technologies
 Nizhny Lomov branch
 Serdobsk branch

References

Universities and institutes established in the Soviet Union
Universities in Penza Oblast
Educational institutions established in 1943
Penza
1943 establishments in the Soviet Union
Cultural heritage monuments in Penza Oblast
Objects of cultural heritage of Russia of regional significance